West Wood may refer to:

West Wood, Little Sampford, a nature reserve in Essex, England
West Wood, Utah, a place in Carbon County, Utah, United States
West Wood Club, a chain of fitness centres in Dublin, Ireland

See also
Westwood (disambiguation)